Adam Gee may refer to:

* Adam Gee (producer) (born 1963), English interactive media and TV producer
 Adam Gee (golfer) (born 1980), English golfer
 Adam Gee (referee), Australian rugby league referee